Chinyere Pigot is a Surinamese swimmer living in Miami, Florida, who attended the University of Connecticut and participated on a collegiate level. Pigot competed at the 2008 Summer Olympics at age fifteen on Suriname's behalf. She used to attend Doral Academy Charter High School in 2011. She was Suriname's flag bearer at the opening ceremony of the 2012 Summer Olympics.

References

https://web.archive.org/web/20141013013711/http://strollersblog.com/importance-children-able-swim

Living people
Swimmers at the 2008 Summer Olympics
Swimmers at the 2012 Summer Olympics
Olympic swimmers of Suriname
Surinamese female swimmers
Swimmers at the 2010 Summer Youth Olympics
Sportspeople from Paramaribo 
1993 births
Swimmers at the 2015 Pan American Games
Pan American Games competitors for Suriname
Swimmers at the 2011 Pan American Games
Competitors at the 2014 Central American and Caribbean Games
South American Games bronze medalists for Suriname
South American Games medalists in swimming
Competitors at the 2014 South American Games